Schistidium antarctici is a species of moss found in Antarctica and subantarctic islands.  It lives in compact clumps that are yellowish green at the top and brownish black at the bottom.  It grows on both soil and rocks.

In the Windmill Islands area of Wilkes Land, Schistidium antarctici is the most common bryophyte. If its habitat supplies ample moisture, it may form a "carpet-like" growth, but if its habitat is dry, it forms a short "cushion-like" growth. It fruits abundantly on Signy Island and elsewhere in Northern maritime Antarctica.

Each capsule of the moss produces between 250,000 and 520,000 spores, each 9.3 μm in diameter and with a volume of 143 μm3.

References

Grimmiales
Flora of the Antarctic